Ocean Master is a supervillain appearing in American comic books published by DC Comics. The character was created by Bob Haney and Nick Cardy, and debuted in Aquaman #29 (September 1966). Ocean Master is the alter ego of Orm Marius, the half-brother and one of the greatest enemies of the superhero Aquaman.

The character has had numerous origin stories throughout his comic book history, having been depicted as a human seafaring pirate in his original appearances during the Silver Age; an Inuit of homo magi descent following Crisis on Infinite Earths; and a pure-blooded, xenophobic Atlantean of royalty who seeks to punish humanity for causing marine pollution since the New 52 continuity reboot. Despite these varying depictions, Orm is consistently portrayed as a jealous and vindictive man who plots to usurp the throne of Atlantis from his half-brother.

Ocean Master has been adapted from the comics into various forms of media. Patrick Wilson portrayed the character in his live-action debut in the 2018 DC Extended Universe film Aquaman, and will reprise the role in the upcoming 2023 sequel Aquaman and the Lost Kingdom. Richard Green, Wallace Langham and Sam Witwer have provided the character's voice in animation.

Publication history 
Ocean Master first appeared in Aquaman #29 (September 1966), created by Bob Haney and Nick Cardy.

Fictional character biography

Pre-Crisis
Orm Curry was Aquaman's fully human half-brother, the son of Tom Curry (Aquaman's father) and a woman named Mary O'Sullivan. He grew up under the shadow of his heroic half-brother and resented the fact that he had none of Aquaman's powers, being fully human, and he was already a petty criminal when he was stricken with amnesia and forgot all about his former life, disappearing shortly afterwards.

Several years later, the self-named Orm Marius reappeared as the Ocean Master, a high-tech pirate who initially attacked ships but quickly moved on to causing natural disasters to hold the world at ransom. Aquaman and Aqualad were captured by Ocean Master but managed to escape. Aquaman was then unable to fight Ocean Master after having seen behind the Ocean Master's mask and realizing that he was his half-brother Orm, although he did stop his plan.

In his subsequent appearances Ocean Master, believing Aquaman was afraid of him, had decided to overthrow Aquaman and usurp his throne. Unable to survive underwater, he made a special costume and helmet to help him breathe while in the ocean and clashed with Aquaman many times. Ocean Master regained his memory when Deadman took posseshis body and unlocked Orm's memories in Aquaman #50 (March–April 1970), but he continued to plot against his half-brother.

==
Orm appeared in his Ocean Master costume in the fourth issue, which is set early in Orin's career as Aquaman and his rule of Atlantis. As in the Pre-Crisis continuity, Ocean Master desires the throne of Atlantis though the reasoning has changed, having learnt his father was an Atlantean wizard. During the events, Aquaman did not know the connection, having only manage to make the connection during his recording of the events into a journal.

Underworld Unleashed 
During the 1995 Underworld Unleashed storyline, Ocean Master later started using mystical powers when he sold his soul to Neron for a powerful trident which gave him great power, but caused extreme agony and hideously scarred his face if he was not actually holding it. With this, he conquered the Dreaming City, a nation of Atlantean offshoots. He was then found by [ng, an "all archenemies" counterpart to the "Big Seven" Justice League. He also attempted to aggravate the tensions between Atlantis and the surface country of Cerdia.

Ocean Master clashed with the JLA again when he attempted to claim the remains of Atlantis following Aquaman's apparent death in the 2001 storyline "Our Worlds At War".

Orm was last seen having used his mystical talents to alter reality so that he was Aquaman and Orin was Ocean Master, using a spell with the bones of Aquaman's lost hand as a focus. As Aquaman, Orm held Sub Diego under his evil rule, restricting the city's growth by claiming that the surface world had been destroyed by the attack that sunk the city. However, Arthur was able to defeat his brother's plot, thanks to Doctor Geist - the scientist who had turned Sub Diego's population into water-breathers, who had studied Aquaman extensively and was unaffected by the spell as Orm did not know he even existed, Geist providing Arthur with enough details of the real world to find the source of Orm's power and destroy it.

The miniseries The Atlantis Chronicles suggests that brothers battling for rulership is a recurring theme in Atlantean history.

In the series Aquaman: Sword of Atlantis, Ocean Master enslaves the Atlanteans who survived the Spectre's destruction of Atlantis, and is using them to mine industrial materials for the surface world.

In the 2005 - 2006 storyline "Infinite Crisis", Ocean Master became a member of the Secret Society of Super Villains.

In the 2008 - 2009 storyline "Final Crisis", Ocean Master is placed on the new Society's inner circle by Libra.

The New 52
In The New 52, DC Comics' relaunch of all of its monthly titles and the rebooting of the DC Universe continuity, Ocean Master's origins are once again revised. Unlike previous depictions of the character, Orm is cast as a full-blooded Atlantean and is initially characterized as having genuinely, brotherly love for Arthur and holds disdain towards "surface dwellers" for their acts that have polluted the oceans for thousands of years and prefers not sharing the Earth with them. Despite inclinations to attack the "surface dwellers" for perceived crimes towards the ocean, Orm instead ruled for the benefit of his people and adhered to a code of conduct.

Origin
Orm was as the second son of Queen Atlanna, making him the younger half-brother of Arthur Curry. After Queen Atlanna has Arthur with a human male, Tom Curry, she gives up the child and allows him to raise their son. Atlanna is forced to return to Atlantis and to marry a member of her royal guard, with Orm the result of the union. As a child, Orm was told stories of terrors of humans ("surface dwellers") and how he had a half-brother on the surface. Saddened, he begged for the Atlantean guard to rescue him but was denied, inspiring him to take the throne to one day "rescue" his brother.

Twelve years later, Orm inherited the throne after mysterious circumstances after the deaths of his father and mother days apart, the former assumed to be killed by his enemies and the latter accused of being killed by Orm himself by the royal advisor, Vulko. Failing to produce evidence, Vulko escapes and plots to overthrow Orm by placing Arthur on the throne. When Vulko is later confronted by Arthur (who is searching for Atlantis), he explains his brother's origins and tells him that Arthur is the rightful heir of Atlantis's throne, and therefore, must overthrow Orm, whom he claims to be corrupt ruler.

When the brothers meet, Aquaman assumes the throne though abdicates it to Orm once more to live out his life as Aquaman under the promise that Orm doesn't attack the surface.

Aquaman: The Others
Aquaman, suspected Orm to be the Atlantean that hired Black Manta to steal Aquaman's scepter, which is an Atlantean relic of great power that was taken from the Dead King's tomb. When the Atlantean retrieves the relic, Aquaman believes Orm is in the Atlantean ship and demands that he reveal himself, but the Atlantean ship escapes. Later, Orm is visited by Aquaman to ask if he took the scepter, but Orm says that he did not, saying that if he wanted the relic scepter he would ask Aquaman for it.

Justice League: Throne of Atlantis
During the 2012 "Throne of Atlantis" storyline, someone sabotages an aircraft carrier and provokes it into attacking Atlantis. Believing to be under attack from the surface, Orm leads Atlantean soldiers to invade the carrier and then wage war on the surface. Orm arrives in Boston, attacking seafarers and asking for his brother, Aquaman. Aquaman confronts Orm and attempts to talk sense to him, but they are interrupted by the Justice League without warning. Aquaman defends his brother, refusing to have him face extradition. Attacked on multiple fronts, Orm electrocutes then imprisons the Justice League within water cocoons. He sends the Justice League to the abyssal plain, while he attempts to sink the city of Boston. While Orm and his Atlantean soldiers plant bombs in an attempt to sink the city and face off against the superheroes that Cyborg called in as reserves, they are attacked by a race of sea creatures known as the Trench. After the Justice League escape from the abyssal plain, Aquaman realizes Orm is not using the relic scepter to sink the city. Since the Trench can only be commanded with the relic scepter, someone else must be using it to manipulate the Atlantean war. The mastermind is revealed to be Vulko. The Justice League arrive to battle both the Atlanteans and the Trench, while Aquaman attacks his brother and tries to convince him that Vulko is responsible for the Atlantean war. However, Orm refuses to listen, believing that Aquaman has been corrupted by the surface world. The Justice League manage to dispose of all the bomb detonators in Boston, but Orm tries to use his control helmet to summon a tidal wave. Mera's power turns the wave to hard water to stop it. Orm is defeated by Aquaman, who reclaims the throne and takes command of the deceived Atlantean soldiers. The Trench are returned home and Vulko is taken in for an Atlantean trial. However, Orm is remanded to Belle Reve for his crimes after abdicating the throne and losing political immunity in the process. As he is taken away, Aquaman apologizes to his brother.

Afterwards, the renegade Atlantean, Murk, makes plans to break Orm - now known by the media as the "Ocean Master" (a name he despises) - out of Belle Reve. While in prison, Orm is advised by his lawyer that he must plead guilty to the criminal charges against him. Murk and other Atlanteans arrive to free Orm, but return home when they receive a message that Atlantis is under attack.

Forever Evil
During the 2013 "Forever Evil" storyline, Deathstorm and Power Ring invade Belle Reve, killing Orm's lawyer. During Belle Reve's prison break, Orm walks out to reclaim his Atlantean garb when a critically wounded prison officer begs for help; seeing that this officer was the only one who showed him any kindness, Orm kills him to end his suffering. He then runs into fellow escapees who are attacking a small-town diner, and whilst he is initially not bothered about confronting them, once they turn their attentions to him, he takes them out. A diner employee named Erin desperately pleads with Orm to save her young son Tommy, but he refuses, instead heading back to the ocean. However, he changes his mind, going back midway through his path to save him.

In the aftermath of the attack, Orm now lives with Erin and Tommy, entertaining the latter with stories of Atlantis. Suddenly, Orm is confronted by King Nereus from Xebel who has found the other four kingdoms. Nereus offers him the opportunity to join him to allow the kings of the Seven Seas to rule Earth once more.

Aquaman: Maelstrom
Although Ocean Master did not appear, it is revealed that Orm was not responsible for his mother death; after Atlanna slew her husband for claiming to kill Arthur, she faked her death and abandoned Orm, leaving him to the inherit the throne. When Arthur met her and gave her an artifact that will allow Atlantis to officially recognize him as the true sovereign of Atlantis, she urged her elder son to not to reveal her true whereabouts to Orm, intending to confront him herself when she is ready.

DC Universe (2017-)
Eventually, Ocean Master re-emerges with a new status quo; now depicted as a reformed super-villain having given up his former life to live on dry land with Erin and Tommy, he is conflicted between the safety of Atlantis and his envious-driven yearning to overthrow his rival and brother, Aquaman.

Mera: Queen of Atlantis
Orm returns in the miniseries Mera: Queen of Atlantis. At the start of the series, he is shown to be engaged to Erin and views Tommy as his son, having decided to leave Arthur to rule Atlantis and settle down with his new family. However, when he learns that his brother has been deposed by the usurper Courm Rath and is now presumed dead, Orm silently leaves Erin and Tommy in the middle of the night, feeling duty bound to reassert his claim to the throne. This brings him into conflict with Mera, whom the power brokers of Atlantis have selected to replace Rath, and his sister Tula, who is now a close ally of Arthur and Mera. Mera defeats Orm and has him imprisoned.

Justice League/Aquaman: Drowned Earth
In the "Drowned Earth" crossover event, when all the inhabitants of Atlantis besides the two of them are transformed into monsters by tainted waters released by a trio of alien sea gods. He leads her to a hidden chamber where an ancient artifact called the Clarion which could repel the invasion is stored, but is himself transformed by the waters.

Ocean Master: Year of the Villain
Orm appears in a one-shot special as part of the Year of the Villain crossover event. Following Drowned Earth, Orm hid as a beggar on the streets of the Ninth Tride, Atlantis' poorest district and closest to the sea floor. Still considered a wanted criminal by Mera's regime and unable to escape the city due to impenetrable guard patrols which he himself designed, Orm wandered the streets, bitter from the feeling that despite sacrificing everything for Atlantis, it neither needed nor wanted him. Orm would learn of a surface king by the name of Dagon who controlled a powerful ocean elemental through an amulet. Later that night, a mad beggar heard the same elemental and would make his escape with Orm following him, learning of a security flaw in Atlantis. Once free, he witnessed someone take the beggar and followed them to a rig where he encountered one of Aquaman's foes, the Marine Maruder, and learned of her new abilities of manipulating the bodies of marine life courtesy of Lex Luthor. He escapes and saves the beggar, who then leads him to where he hears the call of the ocean elemental from the story of King Dagon. Orm manages to find the ocean elemental from the stories after venturing in the deep ocean to the point even an Atlantean body struggled from the pressure. Introducing herself as Lernaea, she frees Orm from the deeper depths of the ocean. Orm would go back to slay the Marine Maruder for her transgressions against the Atlantean she abducted and fed her body to his newfound followers, christening them citizens of the "City of Dagon". King once more, he is visited by a more powerful incarnation of Lex Luthor (known as "Apex Lex") and is offered the chance to gain power through him. Orm rejects his offer and frees the Lernaea, who chooses to freely follow Orm, before threatening Apex Lex to stay out of his oceans. Orm then visits Erin and relays the whole story to her, explaining his whereabouts since he last seen them. Due to his choices in choosing his life as Ocean Master and Atlantis over them, Erin breaks up with Orm though he relents that despite all matters, he considered Tommy his son and will approach him when he is older and give him the option of being his heir before leaving her. Now backed by Atlantean outcasts from the homeless population of the Ninth Tride and the Lernaea from loyalty, Orm officially christens himself king of Dagon.

Aquaman: Manta vs Machine
As Atlantis is in a state of disarray due to Mera being in a coma from a battle with Black Manta and his new weapon and Vulko proving an unpopular impromptu ruler among Atlantean citizens, Orm visits the Atlantean house of healing where Mera is staying in and is present when Aquaman and Mera's daughter, Andrina (nicknamed Andy), is born.

Aquaman: Echoes of a Life Lived Well
Months following the royal birth of Princess Andy, Orm began undermining Mera and her council's rule using his status as king of Dagon with the intent of establishing Dagon a new city-state capital by ushering in several tactical gambits; he manipulates the poorer populace of the Ninth Tride in his growing army, begins winning support from other kingdoms, and manipulates his brother by having Lernaea abduct Andy and hidden away to expose the more dangerous and terrifying side of his brother's personality to stow the question of having a possible ruler who can be considered easily provoked. He later attends the wedding between Mera and Vulko, the latter chosen as part of Mera's own contingency plans to ensure no one else besides someone she trusts can take reign and power, and denounces the idea of Vulko marrying a comatose woman in an attempt to gain power in front of other representatives of the other six kingdoms. When Mera reveals herself to be conscious and intends to bring an end of Atlantean monarchy, his Dagoian forces attack Atlantis with intent to bring down Mera and her rule. Eventually, Aquaman challenges Orm into battle in which either Orm conforms to Mera's act to end Atlantean monarchy or Orm assumes the throne once more. During the battle, Orm cheats and injures Aquaman with his trident. In return, Aquaman calls upon the Justice League, the Sea Gods of the World, and other allies. The battle is interrupted by Dolphin and Orm's second-in-command, Pilot, in which both exposes him as the mastermind behind Andy's kidnapping and his intent in using the Dagoian forces he cultivated in a bid for power. With Lernaea renouncing her loyalty to Orm and himself disgraced and defeated once again, he concedes to the dissolution of the Atlantean monarchy. Although he was seemingly captured, Ocean Master is later revealed to be free.

Aquamen and other titles 
In Aquaman/Green Arrow: Deep Target, time-altering events instead cast him as an enemy of Oliver Queen in flashbacks, whose life was switched with Aquaman. Within the first upheaveals of the timeline changes in an attempt to create the original timeline, Ocean Master is instead portrayed far more friendly to his brother Aquaman, the two agreeing to rule as brother-kings and sharing their birthright. When the original timeline is later restored, Ocean Master is once more Aquaman's enemy and their shared mother, Atlanna, is revealed to have passed away (having done so between the Maelstrom storyline and series).

In the Aquamen series, Ocean Master appears as one of the chief antagonists in the book; he attacks a United Nations Embassy and attempting to kidnap an Atlantean ambassador before being stopped by Aquaman and arrested by Atlantean authorities. As Jackson's patience with Arthur is tested due to the intervention of Black Manta on Arthur's behest, he calls a secret meeting of the Aquaman Family and requests an expert on Atlantean biology (revealed to be Dr. Shin). The Aquaman Family learn that a series of events unfolding on the surface references an oil spill that killed Atlanteans in the past. Jackson seeks out Orm, whom is in an Atlantean maximum security prison, to learn more about the conspiracy. As Orm taunts Jackson, the Xebellian demonstrates his powers to manipulate water by controlling the water in Orm's body as a form of torture to force him to relinquish the information he has. Orm relents but leads him into a trap with the Scavager in Gotham, whom has undergone upgrades and is revealed to be a co-conspirator alongside Orm, as he freed him from Atlantean prison and has him as an accomplise.

Characterization

Personality and themes 
According to Geoff Johns during an interview published on ComicVine, Johns opined that he doesn't view Orm (prior to being known as Ocean Master) as a malicious super-villain, characterizing him as someone doing what he believes is best for the Atlantean people and doesn't quite hate his brother, Arthur. Like many of his fellow people, he shares a bizarre perspective on the "surface world" and has a pride and culture different from the "surface". John's intent for the character included exploring the character in a different manner compared to traditional super-villains such as Sinestro or the Black Hand.

In an interview with Patrick Wilson for his role as Ocean Master in Aquaman, the actor stated that he doesn't view the character as a villain; while considering him a villain in comic book lore as a foil and antagonist, Patrick opined that he is "rooted" in an understandable dilemma of being angry at the pollution and destruction of the ocean. He further speaks upon the character's trait of being angry consistent throughout the character's existence and believes the character's actions of being irrational or reprehensible while believing the character to being justifiable in his anger.

Romances 
During Geoff Johns's run on Aquaman, the character received a love interest in the form of Erin Shaw, a human woman native to Florida whom he saves alongside her son during the events of Forever Evil despite his typical characterization in his aversion and xenophobic views of the "surface world". Due to his relationship with the character, Ocean Master's views changes, seemingly relaxing much of his previous xenophobia towards the surface. Eventually Orm proposes to Erin while becoming Tommy, Erin's son, new father figure.  The two later break their engagement due to Orm's priotization of his homeland over Erin and Tommy, believing that his royal duties calls for sacrificing what he desires most.

Powers and abilities
Throughout the character's history, Ocean Master's powers and abilities change dependent on continuity.

Superpowers and skills

Pre- Crisis version 
The earlier iterations of the character was ordinary human with no metahuman powers; he is a high-tech sea pirate who utilized many innovative gadgetry and weaponry, including a special helmet that enabled him to breathe underwater and body armor that allowed him to withstand the pressures of the ocean.

Post-Crisis version 
After the events of Crisis on Infinite Earths, the nature and ability of the character and his powers were changed, seemingly mystical in nature due to his hybrid nature although unlike Aquaman, whose origin has changed to being the result of a homo magi (Atlan) raised simialrly to a human and a modern Atlantean (Atlanna), he is instead the result of a homo magi (Atlan) and a pure-blood human.

Due to his heritage, Ocean Master possessed powerful magical abilities, having gained power from study of Atlantean lore and drawing from ancient Atlantean talismans. Over time, he became more proficient in various schools of sorcery and could perform acts such as conjuring energy blasts, telepathy, illusions, and manipulation of sea life. Using his mystical powers, he endowed himself to be able to be breathe underwater, swim at greater speeds, and allow him to be unaffected by the deep ocean pressures similarly to modern Atlanteans in the DC Universe. At the height of his magical powers, Ocean Master's hydrokentic abilities was portrayed to be powerful enough to hold back both Superman and Wonder Woman at bay while in Atlantis, the latter speculating his power is more fortified while in his native place of power. He also managed to alter the timeline with his magic and trident, switching his life with his brother and taking mental control of his protege, Aquagirl.

In addition to his powers, Ocean Master is considered a master tactician, nautical genius, and is considered a skilled hand-to-hand combatant, able to match most humans in physical combat although he possesses no enhanced strength.

Post Flashpoint version 
In the New 52 onward, Ocean Master is a full-blooded modern Atlantean and possesses their shared attributes of powers granted by their physiology: he is able to breathe underwater indefinitely, possesses superhuman strength that allows him to freely move underwater and withstand the pressures of the deep ocean, superhuman speed, superhuman durability, and enhanced senses that enable several abilities such as being able to see deep within the depths of the ocean. A drawback of his heritage, however, is that he dehydrates at a faster rate on land than a human. Because he is of the royal bloodline, he exhibits physical abilities greater than the average Atlantean.

Ocean Master is a skilled warrior, attaining a high degree of skill at a young age and is considered a superior fighter to any normal human being with similar training. An able politician and leader, Ocean Master proved to be charismatic among his people, possessing enough influence to found his own underwater city-state of Atlantean mutants where he was considered to be a competent ruler. Ocean Master has also demonstrated skill as a military commander: his attack on the surface world proved effective against the United States military and the Justice League, designating him an "alpha-class" Justice League threat and one of the most dangerous men on Earth. He is also an inventive expert, having upgraded the Scavenger's armor with Atlantean technology to include a more advance computer interface, teleportation, an increase of superhuman strength, and the ability manifest at will; such upgrades and skill were compared to Black Manta's own, whose technology is derived from the lost Atlantean tride known as the Deserters.

Technology and artifacts 
Ocean Master's weaponry and artifacts also vary between continiitues, sometimes bearing similarities with one another:

Both his Pre-Crisis and Post-Crisis versions have access to an array of stolen technology prior to the character's prominence of using magical, his arsenal including harpoon guns, sonic weaponry, nets, and lasers. After the character's re-invention into a character using more sorcerous abiliites, he maintained a collection of artifacts, including a helmet that allows him to breathe underwater indefinitely (later supplied by his trident too or by magic due to being homo magi).  For a time, he possessed a collection of the Zodiac Crystals, including ones imbedded into an Atlantis Royal Seal carried by a previous king and the Lia Fail, an artifact from the city-state, Thierna Na Oge.

His Post-Flashpoint version possess access to both mystical weaponry and Atlantean technology; chiefly, his main weaponry includes a special magical crown that enables him to perform hydrokinetics powerful enough to match the natural abilities of other Atlantean-related hydrokinetics (i.e. Mera). The character also has access to Atlantean technology that allows him to exhibit control over more powerful creatures of the sea and upgrade the Scavenger's suit.

Orm's Trident 
Two versions of Orm's trident, often his main choice of weaponry, has appeared within the character's publication with different abilities and power sets: The Post-Crisis version of Orm's trident is one granted to him by Neron in which increases his magical abilities and discharge mystic energies, the limits in which have been said to be unknown. This trident also makes him able to breathe underwater indefinitely much like his special helmet.

Post-Flashpoint introduces a different version and history of the trident; forged since the days of ancient Atlantis prior to its sinking, the trident is seen as a symbol of Atlantean royaly and possess various powers: the trident allows the user to manipulate weather patterns and manipulate the magnetic field, allowing control over magnetism. The trident is also similarly powerful much like Aquaman's Trident of Neptune, being one of the few weapons able to fight against the entity known as the Abyssal Dark, as shown when Mera temporarily used it, having procured it from Ocean Master during a fight. In an alternate story, Batman and the Justice League Manga, Orm's trident (in which said story shares a similar history to the Post-Flashpoint universe) also possess a special link to the Trident of Neptune.

Other versions

Flashpoint
In the alternate timeline of the 2011 "Flashpoint" storyline, Ocean Master is revealed to have conspired with Artemis and Hippolyta's sister, Penthiselea to start a war between the Atlanteans and the Amazons, during which they would have Aquaman and Wonder Woman killed, in a plot that would eventually see the two conspirators hailed as heroes by the two civilizations for ending the war.

Batman and the Justice League Manga
An alternate version of Ocean Master would appear in the Batman and the Justice League Manga series written by Shiori Teshirogi. The series' iteration of Orm is similar to his New 52 counterpart, the character being a full-blooded Atlantean raised by Orvax and Atlanna and having genuine care for his brother. Unlike the comic book's incarnation of the character, his past with his father is briefly explored, Orvax having raised Orm to regard the surface with contempt. Like the character's previous incarnations, he possess mystic potential and is the only character aside from those originating from the Aramiya family in the story able to manipulate the mystical energy originating from the Ley lines, granting him immense magical powers and enhanced Atlantean physical abilities.

While in imprisonment in Belle Reeve for attempting an Atlantean invasion, he escapes after harnessing power of the Ley lines, gaining special magical abilities he believes will allow him to forcefully take the throne from his brother. Ocean Master encounters Batman and gains the upper hand while showing off his new powers. When Aquaman arrives and Orm prepares to unleash his new abilities against his brother, he is taken by Joker with intent on making him both a member of the Injustice League and to work alongside the series' antagonist, Ankorou's, while both forces plot to use the Ley lines to rewrite the history of Earth in their favor. Orm reluctantly allies himself with Joker and Ankoku before retrieving his weaponry and fighting against his brother once more. Using his abilities to peer into Aquaman's memories, he see's his brother's experiences on the surface and their shared mother's love, having a change of heart and helps Aquaman and Batman defeat Ankorou's vessel threatening Gotham City.

In other media

Television
 Orm appears in the Justice League episode "The Enemy Below", voiced by Richard Green. This version is a lord of the Atlantean royal court who attempts to manipulate Aquaman into declaring war on the surface world. When the latter hesitates, Orm hires Deadshot to assassinate him while the former assumes Atlantis' throne. While Aquaman survives Deadshot's attack, he is arrested by Orm upon his return to Atlantis and left for dead alongside his son. Orm leads a rebellious faction of the Atlantean army to the North Pole to activate an Atlantean weapon, but Aquaman joins forces with the Justice League to confront Orm, during which Aquaman leaves Orm to fall to his death.
 Ocean Master appears in the Batman: The Brave and the Bold episode "Evil Under the Sea!", voiced by Wallace Langham.
 Ocean Master appears in Young Justice, voiced by Roger Craig Smith. This version is a leading member of the Light who masquerades as Aquaman's loving and supportive brother. After being replaced by Black Manta in season two following his identity being exposed and subsequent incarceration in Atlantean prison for six years, Ocean Master returns in the third season episode "Home Fires" plotting to murder the Justice League's families, only to be killed by Lady Shiva on the Light's behalf to prevent mutually assured destruction. As of the fourth season, the Light recovered a psychic scan of Ocean Master's brain and placed it in a clone of Atlantis' founder and first king, Arion in the hopes of taking control of Atlantis. To aid in this plot, they also created a clone of Ocean Master with the original's memories up to his incarceration to sow chaos in Atlantis. After Aquaman captures the clone and a team led by Kaldur'ahm recover Arion's crown to test Arion's identity, the original Ocean Master is killed by the Lords of Order while the clone is made to realize his true nature and set free by Aquaman as he cannot be held responsible for the original's crimes.
 Ocean Master appears in Aquaman: King of Atlantis, voiced by Dana Snyder.
 Ocean Master appears in the Harley Quinn episode "Another Sharkley Adventure", voiced by Alan Tudyk.

Film

 The Flashpoint incarnation of Ocean Master appears in Justice League: The Flashpoint Paradox, voiced by an uncredited James Patrick Stuart. This version loyally serves Aquaman until he is killed by the Amazons.
 Ocean Master appears in the post-credits scene of Justice League: War, voiced by an uncredited Steve Blum.
 Ocean Master appears in Justice League: Throne of Atlantis, voiced by Sam Witwer.
 Ocean Master appears in Lego DC Comics Super Heroes: Aquaman: Rage of Atlantis, voiced by Trevor Devall.
 Patrick Wilson portrays Orm Marius / Ocean Master in the DC Extended Universe film Aquaman and is set to reappear in its upcoming sequel Aquaman and the Lost Kingdom.

Video games
 Ocean Master appears in Aquaman: Battle for Atlantis.
 Ocean Master appears as a boss in the Nintendo DS version of Batman: The Brave and the Bold – The Videogame.
 Ocean Master appears in DC Universe Online, voiced by Sandy McIlree.
 Ocean Master appears as a boss and assist character in Scribblenauts Unmasked: A DC Comics Adventure.
 Ocean Master appears as a playable character in DC Unchained.
 Ocean Master appears in DC Legends.
 Ocean Master appears as a playable character in Lego DC Super Villains.

Miscellaneous
Ocean Master appears in the Young Justice animated series' tie-in comic, in which he is revealed further to be an Atlantean supremacist who believes Atlanteans with human-like appearances are inferior to those biologically adapted to the sea.

Merchandise
 Several collectibles of the DCEU incarnation of Ocean Master were released, including a 6' DC Multiverse figure by Mattel and a Pop! Vinyl statue by Funko.
 Ocean Master, based on his DC Rebirth design, appears in a 2019 Lego Batman set.

References

External links
 Biography on Orm
 Alan Kistler's Profile On Aquaman - A retrospective by comic book historian Alan Kistler tracing Aquaman's history from 1941 all the way to the present day.
 

Characters created by Bob Haney
Comics characters introduced in 1966
DC Comics Atlanteans
DC Comics characters who can move at superhuman speeds
DC Comics characters who use magic
DC Comics characters with accelerated healing
DC Comics characters with superhuman senses
DC Comics characters with superhuman strength
DC Comics telepaths
DC Comics hybrids
DC Comics male supervillains
Fictional characters with superhuman durability or invulnerability
Fictional characters with water abilities
Fictional characters with electric or magnetic abilities
Fictional characters with weather abilities
Fictional characters with energy-manipulation abilities
Fictional eco-terrorists
Fictional kings
Fictional mass murderers
Fictional matricides
Fictional mermen and mermaids
Fictional Native American people
Fictional princes
Male film villains
Video game bosses